Myloplus ternetzi is a medium to large omnivorous fish of the family Serrasalmidae from South America, where found in the east and the northeastern Guiana Shield rivers.

Etymology
The fish is named in honor of ichthyologist and naturalist Carl Ternetz (1870-1928), who made extensive collections of fish in French Guiana for the British Museum.

References

Jégu, M., 2003. Serrasalminae (Pacus and piranhas). p. 182-196. In R.E. Reis, S.O. Kullander and C.J. Ferraris, Jr. (eds.) Checklist of the Freshwater Fishes of South and Central America. Porto Alegre: EDIPUCRS, Brasil.

Serrasalmidae
Taxa named by John Roxborough Norman
Fish described in 1929
Freshwater fish of South America